Daniel Merson Kammen is an American scientist, renewable energy expert, and former government figure. He currently serves as Distinguished Professor of Energy in the Energy and Resources Group at the University of California, Berkeley, and holds a dual appointment at the university's Energy and Resources Group (part of the College of Natural Resources) and the Goldman School of Public Policy. 

Kammen is noted as a coordinating lead author for the Intergovernmental Panel on Climate Change, which won the 2007 Nobel Peace Prize for their report, Climate Change 2007, assessing man-made global warming. In 1998, Kammen was elected a permanent fellow of the African Academy of Sciences, and in 2007 received the Distinguished Citizen Award from the Commonwealth Club of California.

Early life and education
Originally from Ithaca, New York, Kammen is the son of Pulitzer Prize-winning historian and Cornell University professor Michael Kammen. He received his bachelor's degree in physics from Cornell University and his master's degree and PhD in physics from Harvard University. As a postdoctoral researcher at Caltech, Kammen began to transition to energy research, with a focus on the role of energy in developing economies.

Career in government 
On September 15, 2007, Kammen was appointed chief technical specialist for renewable energy and energy efficiency at the World Bank. 

In 2016, he was selected as a U.S. Science Envoy by the United States State Department. He resigned from this position in 2017, citing what he believed to be President Trump's failure to denounce white supremacists and neo-Nazis. His August 23, 2017, resignation letter went viral, as netizens noticed that the first letter of each paragraph spelled out I-M-P-E-A-C-H.

Kammen has been mentioned as a potential Secretary of Energy in a Joe Biden administration.

See also

 Al Gore
 Amory Lovins
 Benjamin K. Sovacool
 Hermann Scheer
 John A. "Skip" Laitner
 Lee Schipper
 Mark Z. Jacobson
 Renewable energy commercialization
 Tom Steyer

References

External links

Cornell University alumni
Goldman School of Public Policy faculty
Harvard University alumni
Intergovernmental Panel on Climate Change lead authors
Living people
People associated with renewable energy
Sustainability advocates
United States Special Envoys
University of California, Berkeley College of Natural Resources faculty
Year of birth missing (living people)
Ithaca High School (Ithaca, New York) alumni